Team Impulse (TiP) was a professional League of Legends team that competed in the North American League of Legends Championship Series (NA LCS). The team was previously known as LMQ and was founded as a sister team to Royal Club that competed in the League of Legends Pro League in China. The team moved to North America on December 15, 2013, and competed in the North American scene. The team previously competed under the name  in representation of their former sponsor . On December 26, the team rebranded as Team Impulse.

History

2013 
LMQ was formed in July 2013 after merging portions of the rosters of Team Livemore and Royal Club Tian Ci: Dreams, F1sh,  from the former; Mor, NoName, TS, XiaoWeiXiao, and PandaB from the latter. LMQ competed in the summer split of the 2013 LPL; despite taking a game off the Season 3 runner-up Royal Club, LMQ finished with a disappointing 8–13 record in sixth place.

In November 2013, after the Season 3 World Championship, F1sh and PandaB moved to LMQ's sister team, Royal Club. At that month's National Electronic Sports Tournament, LMQ went 2–1 in the tournament's group stage after downing CC Club and Team WE Academy while falling to the parent Team WE. In the bracket stage, LMQ lost 1–2 to the tournament favorite and eventual winner OMG, but rebounded in a 2–0 victory against Royal Club in the third place match.

With the assistance of its new sponsor, LMQ moved to North America to take advantage of better esports infrastructure.

2014 
In January 2014, LMQ made their way atop the North American 5v5 Challenger tier and earned an invite to the official Riot-sponsored Challenger Series, also known as the Coke League. In their North American debut, LMQ went 8-0 and beat  2–0 in the finals. By finishing first, LMQ received 9 Challenger Series Points and earned a berth in the second series. There, in March, LMQ went 4–1 on their way to a 2–0 win in the finals against Cloud9 Tempest, thus clinching the top overall seed in the Challenger Series playoffs to be held later in the season.

While competing in the second Challenger Series, LMQ was also offered an invite to the North American Challenger League (NACL) Season 2 Qualifiers, where they went undefeated and secured a spot in the league. During the league's regular season, LMQ went 18-4 without a losing record against any team. During the March playoffs, LMQ defeated Cloud9 Tempest 2–1 in the semifinals and moved on to face Team 8 in the tournament's grand finals. LMQ won the final series 3-1 and became NACL champions.

After having secured a spot in the semi-finals of the Challenger Series playoffs due to their number of points accumulated from both Challenger Series, LMQ went on to defeat Curse Academy in a 2–0 victory sending them to the finals against Cloud9 Tempest. LMQ won the Challenger Series playoffs with a 5–2 record and the grand prize of $16,000.

In April 2014, LMQ secured a spot for the 2014 NA LCS Summer Split after beating XDG Gaming 3–0 in the 2014 Season Summer Promotion Tournament.

LMQ placed 3rd in the Summer playoffs and qualified for the 2014 League of Legends World Championship. The team placed 9 - 12th after failing to make it to the bracket stage.

LMQ became embroiled in an ownership scandal which saw a dispute between the team's original owner, Guanzhou-based Tian Ci Performing Planning and  A&K Esports.

On November 24, Alex Gu announced that LMQ's 2015 would include XiaoWeiXiao once again and that Popstar Adrian had signed with the team as their new support player.

On December 26, LMQ announced that they were rebranding as Team Impulse. The initial roster included Rush, XiaoWeiXiao, and Adrian, with Fly as their head coach. On January 1 WizFujiiN (now Apollo) and then on January 8 Impact joined the team.

2015 
After using Rhux as a substitute for Impact in the first week, Team Impulse finished the round robin with an 11–7 record, in fourth place. In the playoffs, they defeated Gravity before losing to Team SoloMid and then Team Liquid, placing fourth overall. In the summer season, Team Impulse started shakily, placing no higher than sixth through the end of the fifth week. Starting in the sixth week, the team went on a massive winning streak, which was almost able to continue through two roster changes. They were in second place in the standings a while. Adrian sat out one game and was replaced by Gate. Later XiaoWeiXiao was suspended pending an investigation into Elo boosting prior to the ninth week. This prompted Adrian to return and Gate to move back to his primary role of mid lane to replace XiaoWeiXiao. This temporary suspension was eventually lengthened to a competitive ban until February 2016. Regardless, Team Impulse finished the last week tied for third place with Gravity and then won their tiebreaker game.

In the summer playoffs, the team beat Team Dignitas 3-0 before losing to both Counter Logic Gaming and Team Liquid to finish fourth, leaving them with the second-place spot in the Regional Final due to Championship Points. There, they became the second team in a row to fall to underdogs Cloud9 in a reverse sweep and so fell short of the World Championship.

On October 22, it was announced that Team Impulse was for sale. The team failed to sell their spot by the deadline.

2016 
The team competed in the 2016 NA LCS Spring Split where they finished 9th with a record of 5-13.

On May 8th, Riot Games issued a ruling banning Team Impulse from LCS and forcing the team to sell its spot within ten days. The punishment was issued due to Impulse failing to pay its players as well as not providing valid contracts.  Despite the ten day deadline, the team did not sell their spot until May 23, when it was purchased by Phoenix1.

Final roster

Tournament results 
 9th — 2016 NA LCS Spring Round Robin
 3rd — 2015 Season North America Regional Finals 
 4th – 2015 NA LCS Summer Playoffs
 3rd — 2015 NA LCS Summer Round Robin
 4th — 2015 NA LCS Spring Playoffs
 4th — 2015 NA LCS Spring Season

References

External links 
 Official website

2015 establishments in the United States
Esports teams established in 2015
Esports teams based in the United States
Former North American League of Legends Championship Series teams